Alan Weir (born 1 September 1959) is an English former professional footballer who played as a defender for Sunderland, Rochdale and Hartlepool United.

He was a former England youth international and captained England at underage level.

References

1959 births
Living people
Footballers from South Shields
English footballers
Association football defenders
Sunderland A.F.C. players
Rochdale A.F.C. players
Hartlepool United F.C. players
Whitley Bay F.C. players
English Football League players